Jeanne Courtney Hallock (born December 26, 1946), also known by her married name Jeanne Craig, is an American former competition swimmer.

Hallock represented the United States as a 17-year-old at the 1964 Summer Olympics in Tokyo, Japan.  She swam for the gold medal-winning U.S. team in the preliminary heats of the women's 4×100-meter freestyle relay, but did not receive a medal.  Under the 1964 Olympic swimming rules, only those relay swimmers who competed in the event final were eligible to receive medals.  Individually, she also swam in the women's 100-meter freestyle, and logged a time of 1:02.9, but did not advance beyond the event semifinals.

References

External links
 

1946 births
Living people
American female freestyle swimmers
Olympic swimmers of the United States
Swimmers from Los Angeles
Swimmers at the 1964 Summer Olympics
21st-century American women